Shea Holbrook (born April 10, 1990) is an American professional racing driver, entrepreneur and spokeswoman. Currently, she is in retirement starting a family.

Drafting with Denise Mueller-Korenek, Holbrook drove a dragster supporting world record for paced bicycle land speed at the Bonneville Salt Flats in 2018. Denise Mueller-Korenek set the world record.

Early life
Holbrook was raised in Groveland, Florida.  She graduated from the University of Central Florida in 2012, earning a Bachelor of Science degree in communication with a minor in marketing.

She grew up a nationally ranked competitive water skier. At a young age, she saw much success on the water and also learned how to fly her father's plane however never officially took any lessons or required training or obtain a Private Pilots license. An adrenaline seeker, Holbrook wasn't quite satisfied until she was introduced in motor racing.

Racing
Holbrook began her professional racing career with the Sports Car Club of America in 2010. She became the first woman to win the Grand Prix of Long Beach in a touring car during the 2011 Pirelli World Challenge season, and is one of only four women to ever win at the track. Holbrook says that she became interested in racing after attending Richard Petty’s Driving Experience.

Holbrook received her first taste of international motorsport having qualified for the 2019 W Series, a Formula 3 championship for women. One of two Americans in a European-based series (alongside Sabré Cook), she struggled heavily for pace and often found herself at the back of the field with inexperienced Canadian Megan Gilkes – highlighted by qualifying 8 seconds away from the pole time in the opening round at the Hockenheimring. She finished the championship 18th and as the only driver to have contested all races to not score points, with 12th place in Zolder her best result.

Other
In 2016 Holbrook was the pace vehicle driver when Denise Mueller-Korenek set a women's world record for the fastest speed on a paced bicycle with an official speed of 147.75 mph on Utah's Bonneville Salt Flats; no woman had ever attempted the mark before. Mueller-Korenek is the official record holder, with Holbrook only listed in articles a support driver.

Business
Holbrook is involved in many aspects of the motorsport and automotive industries including, keynote and panel public speaking, television, automotive experiential and marketing programs, professional driver coaching, hospitality and marketing management.  
Companies she's developed programs and have worked alongside include, Cadillac, Jaguar, Mercedes AMG, Performance Racing Industry, SEMA, Women in Automotive, Sports Car Club of America’s Track Night in America, CBS Sports Network, and the Wall Street Journal among others.

Achievements
 2017 – Two Top Five's in the North American Lamborghini Super Trofeo Series
 2017 – Top Ten in Pirelli World Challenge Touring Car Championship
 2016 – Top Five in Pirelli World Challenge Touring Car Championship
 2015 – Top Three in IHRA Jet Dragster Championship
 2014 – 2nd Place in the Pirelli World Challenge Touring Car A Championship
 2014 – Recipient of the Women’s Sports Foundations Project Podium Grant
 2013 – 7th place in the Pirelli World Challenge Touring Car B Championships
 2012 – 4th place in the Pirelli World Challenge Touring Car Championships
 2012 – Shea received the “Living Legend Honoree Award” for her on and off track efforts, and was honored in the “Women in Motorsports”, SuperCars Super Show Exhibit and was featured in Teen Vogue and Jalopnik
 2012 – Shea became a member of the all-female TRUECar Racing Women Empowered Initiative
 2011 – Toyota Grand Prix of Long Beach Pirelli World Challenge Touring Car 1st Place – first female driver to win a Touring Car race
 2010 – First professional year of racing taking 6th place in the SCCA Pro Racing World Challenge Touring Car Championships
 2009 – Central Florida Region SCCA Champion for H1
 2009 – Track Record 1:30.027 at West Palm International Raceway class P2
 2008 – Women in the Winners Circle (Lyn St. James Foundation) received Cooper Tire & Rubber Company Scholarship
 2008 – 25 Hours Of ThunderHill 2008, team DivaSpeed, 6th in class, 31st overall of 68
 2008 – First female alternate for the 2008 VW Jetta TDI Cup
 2007 – Sobre Rodas Talent of the Year award (another winner Helio Castroneves)

Racing record

Complete W Series results
(key) (Races in bold indicate pole position) (Races in italics indicate fastest lap)

References

External links

 
 Denise on Bicycling and the Law

1990 births
Living people
University of Central Florida alumni
American female racing drivers
Racing drivers from Florida
People from Florida
Women's Sports Foundation
W Series drivers
21st-century American women